= Bahadarwadi =

Village in Karnataka, India

Bamanwadi, Karnataka बामणवाडी ( ता. जि. बेळगांव )
- Village - बामणवाडी ( ता. जि. बेळगांव )
- Country: India
- State: Karnataka
- District: Belgaum
- Talukas: Belgaum

Languages
  - Official: Marathi, English, Kannada
- Time zone: UTC+5:30 (IST)
- ISO 3166 code: IN-KA

Bamanwadi is a village in Belgaum district in the southern state of Karnataka, India.
